Tropheops novemfasciatus is a species of cichlid endemic to Lake Malawi where it prefers sheltered bays with rocks and vegetation, usually within  of the surface.  This species can reach a length of  SL.  It can also be found in the aquarium trade.

References

novemfasciatus
Cichlid fish of Africa
Fish of Lake Malawi
Fish described in 1922
Taxa named by Charles Tate Regan
Taxonomy articles created by Polbot